The RuSHA trial against the SS racial policies (officially,  United States of America vs. Ulrich Greifelt, et al) was the eighth of the twelve trials held in Nuremberg by the U.S. authorities for Nazi war crimes after the end of World War II. These twelve trials were all held before U.S. military courts in their occupation zone in Germany, not before the International Military Tribunal, although they took place in the same rooms, at the Palace of Justice. The twelve U.S. trials are collectively known as the "Subsequent Nuremberg Trials" or, more formally, as the "Trials of War Criminals before the Nuremberg Military Tribunals" (NMT).

In the RuSHA Trial, the 14 defendants were all officials of various SS organizations responsible for the implementation of the Nazi "pure race" programme: including RuSHA (Rasse- und Siedlungshauptamt, the "Race and Settlement Main Office"); the office of the Reich Commissioner for the Consolidation of German Nationhood (Reichskommissar für die Festigung des deutschen Volkstums, RKFDV; a post held by Heinrich Himmler); the Repatriation Office for Ethnic Germans (Volksdeutsche Mittelstelle, VoMi); and the Lebensborn society. The charges centered on their racial cleansing and resettlement activities.

The judges in this case, heard before Military Tribunal I, were Lee B. Wyatt (presiding judge), Associate Justice of the Supreme Court of Georgia; Daniel T. O'Connell of the Superior Court of Massachusetts, and Johnson T. Crawford from Oklahoma. The Chief of Counsel for the Prosecution was Telford Taylor. The indictment was served on July 7, 1947; the trial lasted from October 20, 1947 until March 10, 1948.

Indictment
 Crimes against humanity in furtherance of "racial purity" programmes by kidnapping children, encouraging or compelling "non-Aryan" pregnant women to undergo abortions, providing abortion services and removing cases of abortion from the jurisdiction of Polish courts; plundering, deportation of populations from their native lands in occupied countries and resettling of so-called "ethnic Germans" (Volksdeutsche) on such lands, sending people who had had "interracial" sexual relationships to concentration camps, and general participation in the persecution of Jews.
 War crimes for the same reasons.
 Membership of a criminal organization, the SS.

All defendants were indicted on counts 1 and 2. Inge Viermetz was excluded from count 3. All defendants pleaded "not guilty".

Defendants

I — Indicted   G — Indicted and found guilty

The four Lebensborn members were not found guilty on counts 1 and 2 of the indictment. The tribunal considered the Lebensborn society not responsible for the kidnapping of children, which was carried out by others.

Greifelt died in Landsberg Prison on February 6, 1949. Hildebrandt was turned over to Polish authorities. He was put on trial for different atrocities in Poland and sentenced to death. He was hanged on March 10, 1951. Hübner, Brückner, and Schwalm were released in 1951. Also in that year, the sentences of Hofmann and Lorenz were reduced to 15 years, and that of Creutz to 10 years. Hofmann was released in 1954.

References

External links

Trial proceedings from the Library of Congress
Description from the U.S. Holocaust Memorial Museum
Notes on the trial
Lebensborn (in German)

United States Nuremberg Military Tribunals
Holocaust trials